19th FCCA Awards
13 March 2011

Best Film: 
Animal Kingdom
The 19th Film Critics Circle of Australia Awards, honoring the best in films from 2010, were presented on 13 March 2011 at North Sydney Leagues Club in Cammeray, New South Wales and hosted by Rod Quinn. The nominees were announced on 8 February 2011 with Animal Kingdom receiving ten nominations. Animal Kingdom won six awards, including Best Film and Best Director.

Winners
Winners are listed first and highlighted in boldface.

Best Film
Animal Kingdom – Liz WattsBeneath Hill 60 – Bill Leimbach
Bran Nue Dae – Robyn Kershaw, Graeme Isaac
Tomorrow, When the War Began – Andrew Mason, Michael Boughen
The Waiting City – Jamie Hilton, Claire McCarthy

Best DirectorDavid Michôd – Animal Kingdom
Stuart Beattie – Tomorrow, When the War Began
Claire McCarthy – The Waiting City
Rachel Perkins – Bran Nue Dae
Jeremy Sims – Beneath Hill 60

Best Actress
Jacki Weaver – Animal Kingdom
Lily Bell-Tindley – Lou
Radha Mitchell – The Waiting City
Miranda Otto – South Solitary

Best Actor
Ben Mendelsohn – Animal Kingdom
Brendan Cowell – Beneath Hill 60
Joel Edgerton – The Waiting City
James Frecheville – Animal Kingdom
Ryan Kwanten – Red Hill

Best Supporting Actress
Essie Davis – South Solitary
Emily Barclay – Lou
Morgana Davies – The Tree
Deborah Mailman – Bran Nue Dae

Best Supporting Actor
Joel Edgerton – Animal Kingdom
Steve Le Marquand – Beneath Hill 60
Guy Pearce – Animal Kingdom
Kodi Smit-McPhee – Matching Jack

Best Screenplay
David Michôd – Animal Kingdom (original)
David Roach – Beneath Hill 60 (adapted)
Stuart Beattie – Tomorrow, When the War Began
Belinda Chayko – Lou
Claire McCarthy – The Waiting City

Best Cinematography
Denson Baker – The Waiting City
Anna Howard – South Solitary
Ben Nott – Tomorrow, When the War Began
Toby Oliver – Beneath Hill 60

Best Editor
Dany Cooper – Beneath Hill 60
Marcus D'Arcy – Tomorrow, When the War Began
Luke Doolan – Animal Kingdom
Patrick Hughes – Red Hill
Veronika Jenet – The Waiting City

Best Music Score
Cezary Skubiszewski – Bran Nue Dae
Mary Finsterer – South Solitary
Antony Partos, Sam Petty – Animal Kingdom
Cezary Skubiszewski – Beneath Hill 60
Michael Yezerski – The Waiting City

Best Foreign Film – English Language
The Social Network
Inception
The King's Speech
Winter's Bone

Best Foreign Language Film
The White Ribbon
Father of My Children
A Prophet
The Secret in Their Eyes

References

Film Critics Circle of Australia Awards
2010 film awards
2011 in Australian cinema